There has been one baronetcy created for a person with the surname Burrell. Another baronetcy passed by special remainder to the Burrell family.

The Burrell Baronetcy, of West Grinstead Park in the County of Sussex, was created in the Baronetage of Great Britain on 15 July 1766 for Merrik Burrell, with remainder to his nephew Peter Burrell. His great-nephew, the second Baronet, was elevated to the peerage as Baron Gwydyr in 1796. For more information, see this title.

The Raymond Baronetcy of Valentine House, in the County of Essex, was created in the Baronetage of Great Britain on 31 May 1774 for Charles Raymond, High Sheriff of Essex from 1771 to 1772, with remainder to his son-in-law William Burrell (the husband of his daughter Sophia), who succeeded him as second Baronet. The latter was the nephew of the first Baronet of the 1766 creation and the uncle of the first Baron Gwydyr. Burrell notably sat as a Member of Parliament for Haslemere. His son, the third Baronet, succeeded to the title of Baronet Raymond of Valentine House on 20 January 1796, and represented New Shoreham in the House of Commons as a Conservative for over fifty years.  He was Father of the House from 1861 to 1862. Both the latter's sons, the fourth and fifth Baronets, sat as Conservative Members of Parliament for New Shoreham.  the title is held by the fifth Baronet's great-great-great-grandson, the tenth Baronet, who succeeded his father in 2008.

The family seat is Knepp Castle, Horsham, Sussex.

Burrell baronets, of West Grinstead Park (1766)
see Baron Gwydyr

Raymond, later Burrell baronets, of Valentine House (1774)
Sir Charles Raymond, 1st Baronet (1713–1788)
Sir William Burrell, 2nd Baronet (1732–1796)
Sir Charles Merrik Burrell, 3rd Baronet (1774–1862)
Sir Percy Burrell, 4th Baronet (1812–1876)
Sir Walter Wyndham Burrell, 5th Baronet (1814–1886)
Sir Charles Raymond Burrell, 6th Baronet (1848–1899)
Sir Merrik Raymond Burrell, 7th Baronet (1877–1957)
Sir Walter Raymond Burrell, 8th Baronet (1903–1985)
Sir John Raymond Burrell, 9th Baronet (1934–2008)
Sir Charles Raymond Burrell, 10th Baronet (b. 1962)

The heir apparent is the present holder’s only son Edward Lambert Burrell (b. 1996)

References

www.thepeerage.com

Baronetcies in the Baronetage of Great Britain
Extinct baronetcies in the Baronetage of Great Britain
Baronetcies created with special remainders
1766 establishments in Great Britain